"Superfast Jellyfish" is the second single released from British alternative band Gorillaz' third studio album, Plastic Beach. The single was released on 9 May 2010.

Background
The song features vocals from Gruff Rhys, lead singer of Super Furry Animals, and from De La Soul, who were previously featured on "Feel Good Inc.". The song contains samples from a 1986 commercial for Swanson's microwave "Great Starts Breakfasts" and an episode of Natural World, "Sperm Whales: Back from the Abyss", narrated by David Attenborough.

Release history
The track premiered on BBC Radio 1's Zane Lowe show on 25 February 2010. About an hour later, it was uploaded to the official Gorillaz YouTube channel. The first official remix of the track, by Unicorn Kid, was premiered on BBC Radio 1's Zane Lowe show on 12 April 2010. On 27 April 2010, the group performed the song live on "Later... with Jools Holland."

Music video
The official music video for "Superfast Jellyfish" was uploaded to YouTube by Jamie Hewlett on 8 March 2010. The video shows a man waking up at the sound of an alarm, going downstairs, and cooking a box of Superfast Jellyfish in his microwave. Once ready, he begins to eat one of the jellyfish, however, he is sent into a trance in which the jellyfish perform a dance around his head. The song received over two million views on Gorillaz' official YouTube channel before the release of the official video.

Track listing
 Promotional CD single
 "Superfast Jellyfish" – 2:54
 "Superfast Jellyfish" (instrumental) – 2:47

 Promotional CD single - Remixes
 "Superfast Jellyfish" (Unicorn Kid Remix) – 3:34
 "Superfast Jellyfish" (Evil Nine Remix) – 6:09
 "Superfast Jellyfish" (Mighty Mouse Remix) – 6:48

Personnel
Damon Albarn – vocals, synthesizers, sampled loops, drum programming
De La Soul – vocals
Gruff Rhys – vocals, additional guitar
Jason Cox – mixing, recording
Gabriel Manuals Wallace – additional drums
Howie Weinberg – mastering
Stephen Sedgwick – recording, programming

Charts

References

2010 singles
Gorillaz songs
De La Soul songs
Funk songs
Songs written by Damon Albarn
Songs written by David Jude Jolicoeur
Songs written by Kelvin Mercer
2009 songs
Parlophone singles
Environmental songs